The Sri Delima MRT station is a mass rapid transit (MRT) station in Batu, northern Kuala Lumpur, Malaysia. It is one of the stations on the Putrajaya Line.

The station began operations on 16 June 2022 as part of Phase One operations of the Putrajaya Line.

Location 
The station is located along Jalan Kepong, next to the Batu river reservoir.

Tenaga Nasional Kepong branch is located right behind the station.

Brem Mall is located 330m southeast of the station, across Jalan Kepong.

Bus Services

Feeder buses

Other buses

References

External links
 Sri Delima MRT Station | mrt.com.my
 Klang Valley Mass Rapid Transit website
 MRT Hawk-Eye View

Rapid transit stations in Kuala Lumpur
Sungai Buloh-Serdang-Putrajaya Line
Railway stations opened in 2022